Star Wars: Visions is an animated anthology series created for the American streaming service Disney+. Produced by Lucasfilm, the series consists of various original stories set in, or inspired by the Star Wars universe.

The first volume of nine anime short films were produced by seven Japanese animation studios: Kamikaze Douga, Studio Colorido, Geno Studio, Trigger, Kinema Citrus, Production I.G, and Science SARU. The creators at each studio were given free rein to re-envision the ideas of Star Wars as they saw fit, while receiving guidance from Lucasfilm's executive team. The volume was released on September 22, 2021, and received positive reviews from critics.

A second volume featuring shorts from animation studios El Guiri (Spain), Cartoon Saloon (Ireland), Punkrobot (Chile), Aardman (United Kingdom), Studio Mir (South Korea), Studio La Cachette (France), 88 Pictures (India), D'art Shtajio (Japan) along with Lucasfilm (United States), and Triggerfish (South Africa) will be released on May 4, 2023.

Premise 
Star Wars: Visions is a collection of animated short films presented "through the lens of the world's best anime creators" in the first volume that offers a new, diverse perspective on Star Wars. Created outside of the constraints of the franchise's traditional canon, the films provide creative freedom to each director and production studio, while maintaining fidelity to the themes and emotional identity of the Star Wars saga. Additional volumes feature animation styles from various companies around the world.

Episodes

Volume 1 (2021)

Volume 2

Production

Development 
Development of the Star Wars: Visions project began when James Waugh, vice president of franchise content at Lucasfilm, pitched the idea to Kathleen Kennedy at the beginning of 2020. To facilitate the international production, Lucasfilm collaborated with independent producer Justin Leach and his company Qubic Pictures, which helped facilitate the discussions between the US-based executives and Japanese studios; this became particularly important during the COVID-19 pandemic, when planned in-person collaborative meetings had to be canceled. Production of the shorts took place in Japan throughout 2020 and 2021.

On December 10, 2020, it was announced that Star Wars: Visions was an anime anthology series of ten short films by different creators set in the Star Wars universe. It was previewed by producer Kanako Shirasaki and the executive producers at Anime Expo Lite in July 2021. At the event, it was revealed that the number of episodes had decreased from ten to nine, due to The Ninth Jedi originally starting development as two films, but was eventually combined into one film. The animation studios creating shorts for the first volume are Kamikaze Douga, Studio Colorido, Geno Studio, Trigger, Kinema Citrus, Production I.G, and Science SARU.

A second season of Visions was announced at Star Wars Celebration in May 2022, to include shorts from studios based in Japan, India, the United Kingdom, Ireland, Spain, Chile, France, South Africa, South Korea and the United States. Waugh described the second volume as "a celebration of the incredible animation happening all around the globe". The animation studios for the second volume are D'Art Shtaijo (along with Lucasfilm), El Guiri, Cartoon Saloon, Punkrobot, Aardman, Studio Mir, Studio La Cachette, 88 Pictures, and Triggerfish. The second volume will be released on May 4, 2023.

Writing 

Star Wars: Visionss stories were not required to adhere to the established Star Wars timeline. The story of The Duel was specifically billed as "an alternate history pulled from Japanese lore". Lop and Ochō is set during the reign of the Galactic Empire between Revenge of the Sith and A New Hope. The Elder is set "sometime before" The Phantom Menace while The Twins involves "remnants of the Imperial Army" after the events of The Rise of Skywalker. The Ninth Jedi explores "what became of the Jedi Knights" after The Rise of Skywalker; director Kenji Kamiyama was particularly focused on wanting to use "the original lightsaber sounds" that are known to children throughout the world. For T0-B1, director Abel Góngora sought to combine visual and narrative elements of the classic trilogy with those of classic anime by drawing parallels between the anime and manga of the 1960s, and the cinema tradition of the late 1970s. In planning her film Akakiri, director Eunyoung Choi noted that "creating visuals that combined both the fairy tale-style lessons of Star Wars with the advanced technology found in this universe... was particularly important."

Music 
In July 2021, it was revealed that Kevin Penkin would be composing the score for The Village Bride, and Michiru Ōshima will be composing for The Twins and The Elder, while Yoshiaka Dewa composed the score for Lop and Ochō and Tatooine Rhapsody, Keiji Inai to compose the score for The Duel, A-bee and Keiichiro Shibuya compose the score for T0-B1, U-zhaan compose the score for Akakiri, and Nobuko Toda and Kazuma Jinnouchi will be composing the score for The Ninth Jedi. Soundtracks for each film were released digitally on October 15, 2021.

Track listings

Release 
Star Wars: Visions was released on September 22, 2021, on Disney+. From September 21 to 27, Disney screened The Village Bride along with movies playing at the El Capitan Theatre in Los Angeles. By November, the studio had submitted the film for consideration for the Academy Award for Best Animated Short Film. The second volume of shorts will be released on May 4, 2023.

Reception

Audience viewership 
According to Whip Media's viewership tracking app TV Time, Star Wars: Visions was the 3rd most anticipated new television series of September 2021. According to Whip Media, Star Wars: Visions was the 5th most streamed original television series in the United States, during the week of September 26, 2021.

Critical response 
The review aggregator website Rotten Tomatoes reports a 96% approval rating with an average rating of 8.20/10, based on 50 reviews for the first season. The site's critical consensus reads, "Gorgeously animated and wildly creative, Visions is an eclectic, but wholly enjoyable collection of Star Wars stories that breathe new life into the galaxy." Metacritic gave the series a weighted average score of 79 out of 100 based on reviews from  15 critics, indicating "generally favorable reviews".

Angie Han of The Hollywood Reporter praised the anthology for "a love of Star Wars that runs so deep it's bound to make new fans of the young and uninitiated, and remind old fans why they fell so hard for this universe in the first place," and highlighted The Duel and T0-B1 as particularly strong installments. Tyler Hersko of IndieWire hailed the anthology as "one of, if not the best, titles - television, film, or otherwise - to come out of the franchise's era under Disney ownership," calling it "beautifully animated and smartly written" with "phenomenal" action scenes. Mike Hale of The New York Times wrote that the individual films "play like auditions for continuing series rather than organic wholes," while calling The Duel, T0-B1, Lop & Ocho, and Akakiri the most interesting and exciting films, and noting the "handcrafted beauty" and "visual variety" of an anthology which achieves "both cross-cultural collaboration and mutual homage." Writing for CNN, Brian Lowry called the shorts "striking" and noted that "Star Wars: Visions does indeed present unique and intriguing visions, indicating there's plenty of room to experiment."

Jake Kleinman of Inverse called Star Wars: Visions "a revelation" and "Lucasfilm's best new story since the original trilogy," and highlighted The Twins as the project's best film. Writing for The A.V. Club, Juan Barquin praised the anthology for sparking "a kind of endless wonder" and rekindling "a child-like fascination with Star Wars", while highlighting T0-B1, The Twins, The Village Bride, Lop & Ocho, and Akakiri as standouts. Jordan Woods of The Harvard Crimson identified The Ninth Jedi, Tatooine Rhapsody, and The Twins as the highlight segments, and called the project as a whole "Star Wars at its best: bold, ambitious, creative, and, most importantly, innovative." Amon Warmann of Empire spotlighted Akakiri, T0-B1, The Duel, and The Ninth Jedi as the best installments, rating the overall anthology with 4 out of 5 stars, and concluding that "the galaxy far, far away has never looked more stunning in animation, and at its best Visions folds core Star Wars tenets into compelling stories with characters you instantly want to see more of. Here's hoping this isn't the only season we get."

In addition to its reviews upon release, Star Wars: Visions was subsequently named one of the best animated projects of 2021 by Paste Magazine, TheWrap, Polygon, Collider, Gizmodo, Anime News Network, /Film, Comic Book Resources, and Rotten Tomatoes. The project was heralded as one of the best Star Wars titles in a decade or more, as well as what the future of the Star Wars franchise should be.

Accolades

Tie-in media 
In March 2021, it was announced that Del Rey Books will publish Ronin: A Visions Novel, an original novel written by Emma Mieko Candon which builds on the story of The Duel. It was released on October 12, 2021.

In May 2022, it was announced that Marvel Comics will publish a Visions comic about the Ronin. The one-shot prequel comic was written and illustrated by Takashi Okazaki, the writer of The Duel. The issue was published on October 12, 2022. An art book with creator interviews and selected production materials from all nine shorts was published by Dark Horse Comics on that same month.

References

External links 
 
 
 

 
2021 anime ONAs
2020s American animated television series
2020s American anthology television series
2020s American science fiction television series
American animation anthology series
American animated science fiction television series
Anime short films
Disney+ original programming
Kinema Citrus
Production I.G
Science Saru
Studio Colorido
Studio Trigger
Television series by Lucasfilm